The 2012 U.S. F2000 Cooper Tires Winterfest was the second year of the winter racing series promoted by the U.S. F2000 National Championship. It consisted of six races held during two race meets in February 2012 and served as preparation for the 2012 U.S. F2000 National Championship.

American Spencer Pigot won five of the six races on his way to dominating the championship over his closest pursuer, Cape Motorsports teammate Trent Hindman. The third Cape driver, Matthew Brabham, was the only other driver to win a race when he captured third race at Sebring and finished third in the championship. Andretti Autosport's Shelby Blackstock and JDC Motorsports' Scott Hargrove were the only other drivers to finish on the podium, with one third-place finish each as they finished fourth and sixth in the championship respectively. Andretti Autosport's Thomas McGregor finished fifth in the championship.

Canadian James Dayson won the National Class championship by one point over American Paul Alspach.

Drivers and teams

The entry list for the Sebring round was announced on February 2, 2012.

Race calendar and results
The race schedule was announced on November 2, 2011.

Championship standings

Drivers' Championship

Teams' Championship

See also
2012 IndyCar Series season

References

External links
U.S. F2000 National Championship official website

U.S. F2000 National Championship seasons
U.S. F2000 Winterfest
U.S. F2000 Winterfest
U.S. F2000 Winterfest